Plastic Age may refer to:

The Plastic Age, 1924 novel
The Plastic Age (film), 1925 silent movie based on that novel
The Age of Plastic, 1979-80 synthpop album by The Buggles
"Living in the Plastic Age" (also known simply as "The Plastic Age"), title track from that album